An election was held on November 8, 2016 to elect all 100 members to Montana's House of Representatives. The election coincided with elections for other offices, including U.S. President, U.S. House of Representatives, Governor and State Senate. The primary election was held on June 7, 2016.

There was no change in the composition of the House with the Republicans winning 59 seats and the Democrats 41 seats.

Results

Statewide
Statewide results of the 2016 Montana House of Representatives election:

District
Results of the 2016 Montana House of Representatives election by district:

References

House of Representatives
Montana House of Representatives
2016